A Forester is a person who practises forestry, the science and profession of managing forests.

Forester  may also refer to:

Butterflies
 Forester butterflies, the genera Euphaedra (typical foresters) and Harmilla (elegant forester)
 Lethe (genus), a group of satyr butterflies commonly known as the foresters

Geography
 Forester, Arkansas, a ghost town
 Forester Township, Michigan, a civil township
 The Forester, Ealing, listed pub in London
 Forester, Tasmania, a locality in Australia

Arts
The Forester (album), 2013 album
The Foresters, play by Alfred Tennyson that premiered in 1892

People
 C. S. Forester
 Forester Sisters
 John Forester (disambiguation), several people
 Nicole Forester
 Forester Augustus Obeysekera (1880-1961), Sri Lankan Sinhala legislator

Fictional characters
Dean Forester, a character in the Gilmore Girls television series
Julie Forester, a character from Piranha 3D

Fraternal organizations 
 Ancient Order of Foresters
 Independent Order of Foresters (operating as Foresters)
 Baron Forester, a title in the Peerage of the United Kingdom
 Free Foresters, a cricket team
 Forester Brigade, an administrative formation of the British Army from 1948 to 1964

Brands
 Subaru Forester, automobile (manufactured from 1997)
 DARPA FORESTER, Foliage Penetration Reconnaissance, Surveillance, Tracking and Engagement Radar

See also
 Forrester (disambiguation)
 Forster (disambiguation)